Andre Brown (born December 15, 1986) is a former American football running back. He played college football at NC State and was drafted by the New York Giants in the fourth round of the 2009 NFL Draft.

Brown has also been a member of the Carolina Panthers, Indianapolis Colts, Denver Broncos, Washington Redskins and Houston Texans.

College career
Brown played four seasons for the NC State, rushing for 2,539 yards and 22 touchdowns on 523 carries. He rushed for 767 yards and seven touchdowns (both career highs) as a senior in 2008.

Professional career

First stint with the Giants
Brown was drafted by the New York Giants in the fourth round (129th overall) of the 2009 NFL Draft. He suffered a ruptured Achilles tendon during training camp on August 14, which forced him to miss his rookie season. He was placed on injured reserve on September 1, 2009. Brown was waived by the Giants on September 4, 2010.

Denver Broncos
On September 5, 2010, Brown was claimed off waivers by the Denver Broncos, waived on September 15, and then signed to the Broncos' practice squad on September 17, 2010. On September 21, 2010 Brown was signed to the active roster, and Lance Ball was waived. Brown himself was waived on October 16, 2010. In four regular season games with the Broncos, Brown played in three but only amassed statistics in one (two rushes for a total of minus one yard in a 31-17 road loss to the Baltimore Ravens on October 10, 2010).

Indianapolis Colts
Brown was claimed off waivers by the Indianapolis Colts on October 18, 2010. Brown was moved to the Colts active roster on November 6, 2010, then waived on November 9, 2010. Brown did not amass any statistics in his only game with the Colts, a 26-24 road loss to the Philadelphia Eagles on November 7, 2010.

Carolina Panthers
Brown was claimed off waivers by the Carolina Panthers on November 9, 2010, and then waived on November 16, 2010.  Brown did not play in his only game with the Panthers, a 31-16 road loss to the Tampa Bay Buccaneers on November 14, 2010.

Washington Redskins
On November 24, 2010, Brown was signed by the Washington Redskins and added to their active roster. He was released on July 28, 2011.

Second stint with the Giants
On August 3, 2011, Brown re-signed with the New York Giants. He was waived on September 3, but re-signed the next day to the practice squad. On February 5, 2012, Brown and the Giants won Super Bowl XLVI against the New England Patriots. After the game Brown became known for his celebratory song, "I got a ring", he and his teammates sang on the plane ride home and at the parade the following week.

In March 2012, Brown was hit with a four-game suspension by the NFL for violating the league's substance abuse policy. He later claimed it was a result of Adderall use  and eventually won an appeal, having his suspension lifted.

On September 16, after starter Ahmad Bradshaw was knocked out of the game with a neck injury, Brown rushed for 71 yards on 13 carries, converting a two-point conversion and scoring the game-winning touchdown against the Tampa Bay Buccaneers.

On September 20, Brown stepped in as the starter for the Giants against the Carolina Panthers on Thursday Night Football.  Brown rushed for 113 yards on 20 carries, scoring two rushing touchdowns.  He also had 3 receptions for 17 yards.

On November 25, he suffered a broken fibula in the fourth quarter on a Sunday Night Football game against the Green Bay Packers at MetLife Stadium, effectively ending his season.  He ended the season, where he participated in 10 games, with 73 carries for 385 yards, with a 5.3 yard per carry average, after only 2 carries in the previous 3 seasons. He was eventually placed on injured reserve.

In 2013, Brown injured his leg in the final preseason game for the New York Giants.  He was expected back by week 10.
He did return week 10 to face the Oakland Raiders, where he accumulated 115 yards rushing and one rushing touchdown in his 2013 debut.

Houston Texans
On April 7, 2014, Brown signed a one-year contract with the Houston Texans. He was released on August 11.

References

External links
NC State Wolfpack bio
New York Giants bio
Houston Texans bio

1986 births
Living people
American football running backs
Carolina Panthers players
Denver Broncos players
Houston Texans players
Indianapolis Colts players
NC State Wolfpack football players
New York Giants players
Sportspeople from Greenville, North Carolina
Players of American football from Baltimore
Players of American football from North Carolina
Washington Redskins players